Warrgamay is an extinct Australian Aboriginal language of northeast Queensland. It was closely related to Dyirbal.

It is also known as Waragamai, Wargamay, Wargamaygan, Biyay, and Warakamai. The language region includes the Herbert River area, Ingham, Hawkins Creek, Long Pocket, Herbert Vale, Niagara Vale, Yamanic Creek, Herbert Gorge, Cardwell, Hinchinbrook Island and the adjacent mainland.

References

Sources
Dixon, R.M.W. 1981. 'Wargamay'. In Handbook of Australian languages vol. 2, eds R.M.W. Dixon and B.J. Blake, pp. 1-144 + map. Canberra: ANU Press.

External links 

 Djuunydjibali: the Warrgamay Maya Language Story, State Library of Queensland. A short video about the Warrgamay Maya Language Story project, undertaken by Melinda Holden and Bridget Priman, to document and preserve the Warrgamay Language.
 Warrgamay Language Recording, State Library of Queensland
 Bridget Priman digital story, State Library of Queensland. Digital Story discussing Wargamaygan language

Dyirbalic languages
Extinct languages of Queensland